Colyear Springs is a spring in the U.S. state of California.

Colyear Springs was named after John G. Colyear, a pioneer settler. Variant names were "Colyer Springs" and "Colyer's Springs".

References

Springs of California
Rivers of Tehama County, California